Aedophron venosa is a species of moth of the family Noctuidae. It is found in Turkmenistan and Iran.

Heliothinae
Moths of Asia
Moths described in 1887